The M. Ct. family, formerly known as the S. Rm. M. M. Ct. family, is a family of industrialist and bankers from Tamil Nadu, India. Belonging to the Nagarathar community, they are descendants of S. Rm. M. Chidambaram Chettiar of the S. Rm. M. family and trace their ancestral roots to Kanadukathan in the Sivaganga district.

First generation 

 Sir M. Ct. Muthiah Chettiar (1887-1929), eldest son of S. Rm. M. Chidambaram Chettiar. Director of Indian Bank and member of the Imperial Legislative Council of India. First Nattukottai Chettiar to be knighted.
 Diwan Bahadur M. Ct. Pethachi Chettiar (1889-1924), second son of S. Rm. M. Chidambaram Chettiar. Zamindar of Andipatti.

Second generation 

 M. Ct. M. Chidambaram Chettyar (1908-1955), oldest son of Sir M. Ct. Muthiah Chettiar. Founder of Indian Overseas Bank (IOB) and Travancore Rayons Limited.

Third generation 

 M. Ct. Muthiah (1929-2006), oldest son of M. Ct. M. Chidambaram Chettyar. Industrialist and banker.

References

Business families of India